The women's 3000 metres speed skating competition of the 2018 Winter Olympics was held at Gangneung Oval in Gangneung on 10 February 2018.

Summary
Competitors included reigning 2014 champion Ireen Wüst (also the 2006 gold medallist), 2010 champion Martina Sáblíková (also the 2014 silver medallist), and 2002 victor Claudia Pechstein. The 2014 bronze medallist Olga Graf qualified for the event but decided not to compete.

Skating in the 5th pair, Carlijn Achtereekte posted the then-fastest time and remained in the gold medal position throughout the event. In the 9th pair Ireen Wüst held a lead over Achtereekte's time for most of her race, but ultimately finished 0.08 seconds behind to take second place. In the 11th pair Antoinette de Jong posted the third fastest time, and in the final pair Martina Sáblíková came up half a second short of the bronze medal position, finishing fourth. There was a podium sweep for the Netherlands.

In the victory ceremony, the medals were presented by Mamadou Diagna Ndiaye, member of the International Olympic Committee; accompanied by Sergio Anesi, ISU council member.

Records
Prior to this competition, the existing world, Olympic and track records were as follows.

No new records were set during the competition.

Results
The races were started at 20:00.

References

Women's speed skating at the 2018 Winter Olympics